The City Club of Cleveland is a non-partisan debate forum in Cleveland, Ohio. Founded in 1912, the club's home is the City Club Building, formerly the Citizens Building, on Euclid Avenue in Downtown Cleveland. Known as "America's Citadel of Free Speech," it is one of the oldest continuous independent free speech forums in the United States.

The mission of the City Club is to "create conversations of consequence that help democracy thrive." Membership is open to anyone and all programs are open to the general public, although members are charged lower prices to attend most forums and given preference in making reservations to certain programs.

History

The City Club was conceived at a luncheon in June 1912 organized by Mayo Fesler, secretary of the Cleveland Municipal Association, in the ideals of the Progressive Era. Future Cleveland City Manager Daniel E. Morgan was its first president. Since its founding, it has hosted sitting U.S. Presidents and Vice-Presidents and other notable citizens of the United States and the world. Archbishop Desmond Tutu called the club "a beacon, a symbol and a sentinel for freedom, for justice, for tolerance" when he spoke there.

The first President to have appeared at the City Club was Theodore Roosevelt; every President since Jimmy Carter has appeared at its podium. President George W. Bush spoke to the club on the third anniversary of the United States' invasion of Iraq. Because the City Club of Cleveland does not allow questions from the audience to be pre-screened, President Ronald Reagan declined to appear before the Club, but when questions were raised by the media about his mental acuity, Reagan sought out an appearance before the Club to refute those charges.

The day after Martin Luther King Jr. was assassinated in 1968, Senator Robert F. Kennedy gave his On the Mindless Menace of Violence speech at the club.

In 1976, as part of the United States Bicentennial, the club held a forum in Britain, the club's first outside the United States.

Debates before the Club have swayed Ohio elections. Before John Glenn defeated Howard Metzenbaum in the 1974 Democratic Senate primary, Glenn responded to a charge in an earlier debate that he never had to make a payroll:

 
During the 2010 Congressional elections, in which the Republicans regained control of the House of Representatives, John Boehner on August 24, 2010, announced a five-point plan at the club that he said would provide an effective economic alternative to the Democrats' course.

Sometimes politicians decline to appear at forums because it would provide exposure to their opponents in a political race. Congressman Dennis Kucinich, who complained vociferously about being excluded from debates among the Democratic candidates for President, has several times refused to debate his opponent for Congress in The City Club of Cleveland debates.

The club has been criticized for bestowing its "Citadel of Free Speech" award upon Justice Antonin Scalia, who then refused to allow his speech to be broadcast. The Board of Trustees of the City Club defended its actions by noting that the press was welcome to attend the special presentation and report upon the event. Other recipients of the Citadel of Free Speech award include John Glenn, Martin Luther King's aide and U.N. Ambassador Andrew Young, and CNN founder Ted Turner.

Creed of the City Club 

In 1916, Ralph Hayes, then the Secretary of the City Club, penned its creed.

Friday Forum
The City Club's Friday Forum is broadcast live on the radio in more than 40 states from Maine to Alaska. The broadcast is initiated live on Ideastream Public Media's WKSU (relayed over a regional network including WCPN) with encore broadcasts on co-owned WCLV. Most stations, including the iHeartMedia station group in Cleveland, air the Friday Forum as part of their Sunday morning public service requirements.

Television broadcasts of the City Club's Friday Forum also occur over Ideastream's WVIZ and on The Ohio Channel, and are often also aired nationwide on C-SPAN as part of their regular coverage of civic and political discussions and forums throughout the United States.

Notable guests

 Isabel Allende
 Sherrod Brown
 George W. Bush
 Jimmy Carter
 Bill Clinton
 Ta-Nehisi Coates
 Marian Wright Edelman
 Robert F. Kennedy
 John Kerry
 Peter B. Lewis
 Akil Marshall
 Reverend Otis Moss Jr.
 Ralph Nader
 Barack Obama
 Rosa Parks
 Ronald Reagan
Theodore Roosevelt
Louis Stokes
Jim Thome
Archbishop Desmond Tutu
Janet Yellen
Joe Biden

References

External links

 
 City Club Catering
 Complete as-delivered transcript and audio mp3 of Robert F. Kennedy's Mindless Menace of Violence Speech at the City Club of Cleveland AmericanRhetoric.com

Culture of Cleveland
Organizations based in Cleveland
Organizations established in 1912
1912 establishments in Ohio